Eupithecia saphenes is a moth in the family Geometridae. It is found in Venezuela.

The wingspan is about 20 mm for females. The forewings are tinged with reddish.

References

Moths described in 1916
saphenes
Moths of South America